The meridian 126° west of Greenwich is a line of longitude that extends from the North Pole across the Arctic Ocean, North America, the Pacific Ocean, the Southern Ocean, and Antarctica to the South Pole.

The 126th meridian west forms a great circle with the 54th meridian east.

From Pole to Pole
Starting at the North Pole and heading south to the South Pole, the 126th meridian west passes through:

{| class="wikitable plainrowheaders"
! scope="col" width="130" | Co-ordinates
! scope="col" | Country, territory or sea
! scope="col" | Notes
|-
| style="background:#b0e0e6;" | 
! scope="row" style="background:#b0e0e6;" | Arctic Ocean
| style="background:#b0e0e6;" |
|-
| style="background:#b0e0e6;" | 
! scope="row" style="background:#b0e0e6;" | Beaufort Sea
| style="background:#b0e0e6;" |
|-valign="top"
| 
! scope="row" | 
| Northwest Territories — for about 1 km, westernmost point of Banks Island (Cape Kellett) 
|-
| style="background:#b0e0e6;" | 
! scope="row" style="background:#b0e0e6;" | Amundsen Gulf
| style="background:#b0e0e6;" |
|-valign="top"
| 
! scope="row" | 
|-
| style="background:#b0e0e6;" | 
! scope="row" style="background:#b0e0e6;" | Pacific Ocean
| style="background:#b0e0e6;" |
|-
| style="background:#b0e0e6;" | 
! scope="row" style="background:#b0e0e6;" | Southern Ocean
| style="background:#b0e0e6;" |
|-
| 
! scope="row" | Antarctica
| Unclaimed territory
|-
|}

See also
125th meridian west
127th meridian west

w126 meridian west